There's Beauty in the Purity of Sadness is the second album by industrial metal band Red Harvest. It was released through Voices of Wonder in 1994.

Track listing 
 "Wounds" − 5:24
 "Naked" − 4:20
 "Resist" − 4:51
 "Mindblazt" − 4:35
 "Mastodome" − 7:53
 "Shivers" − 2:49
 "?" − 1:40
 "Mother of All" − 5:04
 "a.b.g.l.e.a.k." − 2:37
 "Sadness" − 5:31
 "The Art of Radiation" − 7:43

References

External links
 Red Harvest's official website

1994 albums
Red Harvest (band) albums